Show Yanagisawa is a Japanese film director, painter and animation director.

Life
Yanagisawa was born in Tokyo 1982. He started his career as a graffiti art live-painting artist combined with abstract painting.

In 2009, he won the Grand Prix in film category of the Asia Pacific Advertising Festival.

In 2016, he directed the Shiseido ad "High School Girl?", and 2017 SIE ad "Gravity Cat", winning the grand prix in film category at Epica Awards, and the New York Festivals. 
The ad also won a gold at the Cannes Lions and the Clio Awards, and appeared on several lists for best advertising spots of 2015.

In 2015, he directed the first worldwide trailer of Pokémon Go.

Awards 

Pocari Sweat / "Find your own way"  
 D&AD 2022 —Production Design—Yellow Pencil
 D&AD 2022 —Direction—Wood Pencil
 CICLOPE ASIA 2021 —Direction— GRAND PRIX
 ADFEST 2022 —Film Craft— GRAND PRIX
 Cannes Lions  2022 —Film Craft— BRONZE
 One Show 2022 —Moving Image Craft—GOLD
Shiseido / "The Party Bus"  
 Epica Awards 2018 —Film— GRAND PRIX
 Epica Awards 2018 —Direction & Cinematography— GOLD
 Epica Awards 2018 —Health & Beauty— GOLD
 ADFEST 2019 —Film Craft— GRAND PRIX
 ADFEST 2019 —Animation—GOLD
 ADFEST 2019 —Film— BRONZE
 D&AD 2019 —Cinematography—Graphite Pencil
 D&AD 2019 —Animation—Wood Pencil
 D&AD 2019 —Branded Entertainment—Wood Pencil
 D&AD 2019 —Direction—Wood Pencil
 ANDY AWARDS 2019 —Film Craft— GOLD
Shiseido / "High School Girl ?"  
 Cannes Lions 2016 —Film Lions— GOLD
 Cannes Lions 2016 —Film Craft Lions— GOLD
 NEW YORK FESTIVALS 2016 —Film— Best of Show, GRAND PRIZE
 Epica Awards 2015 —Film— GRAND PRIX
 Epica Awards 2015 —Direction & Cinematography— GRAND PRIX
 Epica Awards 2015 —Luxury— GOLD
 Clio Awards 2016 —Film— GOLD
 One Show —online— GOLD
 Andy Awards 2016 —Art Direction— GOLD
 AD FEST 2016 —Film Lotus— GOLD
 Spikes Asia 2016 —Film Craft— GRAND PRIX
 Spikes Asia 2016 – Film Lotus— GOLD
 D&AD 2016 —Branded Film Content—Silver Pencil
 D&AD 2016 —Film Advertising Crafts—Wood Pencil

SIE / Gravity Rush 2 "Gravity Cat"  
 Cannes Lions 2017 —Film Craft – Production Design/Art Direction— GOLD 
 Cannes Lions 2017 —Film Craft – Direction— SILVER
 Cannes Lions 2017 —Film— SILVER
 Cannes Lions 2017 —Film Craft – Visual Effects— BRONZE
 Cannes Lions 2017 —Entertainment – Online Fiction— BRONZE
 Cannes Lions 2017 —Cyber – Social Video— BRONZE
 Cannes Lions 2017 —Cyber – Brand/Product— BRONZE
 One Show 2017 —Craft— GOLD
 NEW YORK FESTIVALS 2017 —Film— GRAND PRIZE
 NEW YORK FESTIVALS 2017 —Branded Entertainment— GRAND PRIZE
 NEW YORK FESTIVALS 2017 —Film Craft— GOLD
 D&AD AWARDS 2017 —Branded Film Content—Silver Pencil
 ANDY AWARDS 2017 —Advertiser— GOLD
 ANDY AWARDS 2017 —Craft— GOLD
 AD STARS  —Film  – Commercial Public Services— Grand Prix	
 AD STARS  —Film Craft  – Art direction / Production design— Gold	
 AD STARS  —Video Stars  – Branded Entertainment Videos— Gold	
 AD STARS  —Video Stars  – Branded Viral Videos— Gold	
 AD STARS  —Interactive  – Online ad— Silver	
 Clio Awards  —Film Technique  – Direction— Gold
 Clio Awards  —Branded Content  – Film— Silver
 Clio Awards  —Film  – Short form— Bronze
 Clio Awards  —Film Technique  – Visual Effects— Bronze
 Clio Awards  —Social Media  – Social Video— Bronze
 ACC Creativity Awards  —Online Film— Grand Prix
 ACC Creativity Awards  —Interactive— Bronze
 Spikes Asia  —Entertainment  – Online: Fiction— Grand Prix	
 Spikes Asia  —Film Craft  – Achievement in Production— Gold	
 Spikes Asia  —Film Craft  – Visual Effects— Silver	
 Spikes Asia  —Film Craft  – Production Design / Art Direction— Bronze	
 Spikes Asia  —Film  – Media & Publications— Gold	
 Spikes Asia  —Digital  – Brand / Product Video— Silver	
 Spikes Asia  —Digital  – Social Video— Bronze	
 Spikes Asia  —Digital Craft  – Video / Moving Image— Bronze	
 Spikes Asia  —Design  – Motion Graphics Design & Animation— Bronze	
 LIA Awards  —Production & Post-Production  – Production Design— Gold	
 LIA Awards  —Production & Post-Production  – Direction— Silver	
 LIA Awards  —Production & Post-Production  – Visual Effects— Silver	
 LIA Awards  —TV/Cinema/Online Film  – Branded Content— Silver	
 LIA Awards  —TV/Cinema/Online Film  – Recreational— Silver	
 Clio Entertainment Awards  —Branded Entertainment— Grand Prix
 Clio Entertainment Awards  —Audio/Visual— Gold
 Clio Entertainment Awards  —Visual Technique— Gold

Hakusensha / LALA GIRL'S COMIC MAGAZINE "LaLa Reports"  
 AD FEST 2009 —Film Lotus— GRAND PRIX 
 AD STARS 2009 —Distribution/Publication— GOLD 
 AD STARS 2009 —Film/Direction— GOLD
 Spikes Asia 2009 – Publications & Media— Silver
 
Google / "Google Maps 8-bit for NES"
 London International Award 2012 —Branded Content— GOLD
 AD FEST 2013 —Design Lotus— GOLD 
 AD STARS 2012 —Interactive— GOLD
 Spikes Asia 2012 – Publications & Media— Bronze
 Cannes Lions 2012 —Cyber Lions— Short List
 16th Japan Media Arts Festival —Entertainment Division— Jury Award winner
 AD FEST 2014 —Film Lotus— GOLD

SUBARU / "Mini car light stream"  
 AD FEST 2014 —Film Craft— Bronze 
 AD STARS 2014 —Film/Direction— Bronze
 Spikes Asia 2014 – Film Lotus— Silver 
 Spikes Asia 2014 – Film Craft— Bronze
 London International Award 2012 —Innovative Use of Radio— Bronze
 Spikes Asia 2012 –Digital Tools— Silver
 Yahoo! Creative Award 2014 — GRAND PRIX

Avex Music / Ai Otsuka "I Love XXX"  
 14th Japan Media Arts Festival —Entertainment Division— Jury Award winner

Universal Music / JAYED"Everybody"  
 MTV Video Music Award 2010 —Best Male Video— winner

"Lost and Found"  40TH Montreal World Film Festival 
 First Films World Competition— Finalist
 19TH Shanghai International Film Festival —International Panorama—New Director

References

External links
SHOW YANAGISAWA  OFFICIAL SITE
Show Yanagisawa | Ridley Scott Associates Films
PRETTYBIRD | Show Yanagisawa
Show Yanagisawa | DIVISION

1982 births
Advertising directors
Japanese film directors
Living people
People from Tokyo